Ana Arnau (born 20 September 2005) is a Spanish rhythmic gymnast. She's the bronze All-Around and 5 hoops medalist at the 2022 World Championships.

Career

Junior 
Arnau was part of the Spanish junior group that competed at both the 2019 European and World Championships, finishing 7th in Baku and 5th in Moscow.

Senior 
Ana debuted with senior group in 2022 at the World Cup in Sofia, they were 5th in the All-Around and 5 hoops and 6th with 3 ribbons + 2 balls. In Baku they were 12th in the All-Around and therefore didn't qualify for event finals. A month later in Pamplona they won bronze in the All-Around and silver with 5 hoops. In Portimão they won 3 silver medals. They won All-Around bronze and 5 hoops and silver with 3 ribbons + 2 balls in Cluj-Napoca. Inéz took part, with Inés Bergua, Valeria Márquez, Patricia Pérez, Mireia Martínez and Salma Solaun in the 2022 European Championships in Tel Aviv, winning silver in the 3 ribbons + 2 balls final, and the World Championships in Sofia where the Spanish group won three bronze medals: All-Around (earning them a spot for the 2024 Olympics), 5 hoops, and team.

References 

2005 births
Living people
Spanish rhythmic gymnasts
Medalists at the Rhythmic Gymnastics European Championships
Medalists at the Rhythmic Gymnastics World Championships